Women's 60 kg competition at the 2015 European Games in Baku, Azerbaijan, took place on 22 June at the Heydar Aliyev Arena.

Schedule
All times are Azerbaijan Summer Time (UTC+05:00)

Results

Repechage

References

External links

Sambo at the 2015 European Games